Vrtovin ( or) is a village on the northern edge of the Vipava Valley in the Municipality of Ajdovščina in the Littoral region of Slovenia. It includes several smaller hamlets: Grželi, Čebuli, Fužina, Guli, and Stovška Vas south of the main village and Krti, Šateji, Subani, Jama, Kocjani, Rebki, Čermeli, Guštini, Fevči, and Lozarji to the north.

The local church is dedicated to the Assumption of Mary and belongs to the Parish of Kamnje.

References

External links 

Vrtovin at Geopedia

Populated places in the Municipality of Ajdovščina